Millana is a municipality located in the province of Guadalajara, Castile-La Mancha, Spain. According to the 2004 census (INE), the municipality has a population of 158 inhabitants.

Millana's Church of Santo Domingo de Silos is included on Spain's heritage register, in the category Bien de Interés Cultural.

References

Municipalities in the Province of Guadalajara